Cedar Spring is an unincorporated community in Edmonson County, Kentucky, United States.

The community was named for a row of cedar trees which grew along the natural springs that supplied settlers with fresh water.

Cedar Spring, Kentucky, is located along Kentucky State Highway 259 and Chaumont Road in proximity to Mammoth Cave National Park.

It has a large number of oil and natural gas wells.

References

Unincorporated communities in Kentucky
Unincorporated communities in Edmonson County, Kentucky